Silas A. Conrad (June 7, 1840 – September 11, 1913) was an American politician who served as the 19th lieutenant governor of Ohio from 1887 to 1888 under Governor Joseph B. Foraker. He previously served as president of the Ohio State Senate.

He died in Massillon, Ohio on September 11, 1913.

References

External links
 

Lieutenant Governors of Ohio
Presidents of the Ohio State Senate
1840 births
1913 deaths
People from Massillon, Ohio
19th-century American politicians